The 1972 Preakness Stakes was the 97th running of the $200,000 Preakness Stakes thoroughbred horse race. The race took place on May 20, 1972, and was televised in the United States on the CBS television network. Bee Bee Bee, who was jockeyed by Eldon Nelson, won the race by one and one half lengths over runner-up No Le Hace. Approximate post time was 5:40 p.m. Eastern Time. The race was run on a sloppy track in a final time of 1:55-3/5.  The Maryland Jockey Club reported total attendance of 48,721, this is recorded as third highest on the list of American thoroughbred racing top attended events for North America in 1972.

Payout 

The 97th Preakness Stakes Payout Schedule

The full chart 

 Winning Breeder: William S. Miller; (MD)
 Winning Time: 1:55 3/5
 Track Condition: Sloppy
 Total Attendance: 48,721

References

External links 
 

1972
1972 in horse racing
Horse races in Maryland
1972 in American sports
1972 in sports in Maryland